Ana Ramírez (born ) is a Spanish female former volleyball player, playing as a libero. She was part of the Spain women's national volleyball team.

She competed at the 2009 Women's European Volleyball Championship. On club level she played for Diego Porcelos in 2009.

References

1981 births
Living people
Spanish women's volleyball players
Place of birth missing (living people)